Footloose is a 2011 American musical drama film co-written and directed by Craig Brewer. It is a remake of the 1984 film of the same name and stars Kenny Wormald, Julianne Hough, Miles Teller, Andie MacDowell and Dennis Quaid. The film follows a young man who moves from Boston to a small Southern town and protests the town's ban against dancing. Filming took place from September to November 2010 in Georgia. It was released in Australia and New Zealand on October 6, 2011, and in North America on October 14, 2011. It grossed $15.5 million in its opening weekend and $63 million worldwide from a $24 million budget.

Plot
After a long night of partying, an intoxicated Bobby Moore and his friends are killed when their car collides head-on with a truck on a bridge on their way home to the town of Bomont, Georgia. This prompts his father Shaw Moore, the town reverend, to persuade the city council to pass several draconian laws and ordinances, one of which bans all unsupervised dancing within city limits.

Three years later, Boston-raised teenager Ren McCormack moves to Bomont to live with his uncle Wes Warnicker, aunt Lulu, and cousins Sarah and Amy after his mother's death from leukemia and his father's desertion. Upon arrival, Ren befriends fellow Bomont High senior Willard Hewitt, who explains the ban on dancing.

He soon begins to be attracted to Shaw's rebellious daughter Ariel, who is dating dirt-track driver Chuck Cranston. After Chuck insults him, Ren ends up in a race involving buses and wins despite his inability to drive one and almost getting killed. Shaw mistrusts Ren and forbids Ariel from ever seeing him again. Ren and his classmates want to do away with the law and have a senior prom. He also teaches Willard how to dance.

After a while, Ariel begins to fall for Ren and dumps Chuck, resulting in a fight between them. Later in church, Shaw finds out about it and demands Ren's arrest, but Ariel tells him that he can't blame everything on Ren like he did with Bobby. She then reveals that she lost her virginity, prompting Shaw to beg for her to not talk like that in church. Ariel then sarcastically asks him if he will pass another law, as it didn't stop her and Chuck from having sex. Shaw slaps her abruptly, shocking his wife Vi, and prompting Ariel to tearfully and angrily criticize his domineering ways and storm out.

When Shaw tries to apologize Vi stops him, telling him he has gone too far. Supporting the dancing movement, she tells him that he is not being good to Ariel, he cannot be everyone's father and dancing and music are not the problems.

Ren goes before the city council and reads several Bible verses given to him by Ariel. They describe that even in ancient times people would dance to rejoice, exercise, celebrate or worship.

Despite the city council voting against him, Ren's boss offers his cotton mill, which is technically in the neighboring town of Bayson, to let the seniors have their prom. Knowing that Shaw still has enough influence to pressure the parents not to let their teenagers come, Ren visits him one evening. In the conversation they realize their common ground is the loss of a loved one. After Shaw tells the story of Bobby, Ren describes his mother's death and states that even though they denied the motion to dismiss the law, they cannot stop the dance. He then respectfully requests to take Ariel, and Shaw agrees.

A few days before the prom, Shaw unexpectedly asks his congregation to pray for the high school students putting on the prom. The students (and many parents) prepare and decorate the mill for the prom.

Not long after Ren and Ariel arrive at the prom, Chuck and several of his friends arrive to instigate chaos. However, Ren, Willard, Ariel and her best friend Rusty Rodriguez subdue them. Ren goes inside, exclaiming "Hey, I thought this was a party!" Then he flings confetti into a shredding machine and yells, "Let's dance!" as everyone joins in dancing to the opening song "Footloose".

Cast
 Kenny Wormald as Ren McCormack
 Julianne Hough as Ariel Moore
 Miles Teller as Willard Hewitt
 Andie MacDowell as Vi Moore
 Dennis Quaid as Reverend Shaw Moore
 Ser'Darius Blain as Woody
 Ziah Colon as Rusty Rodriguez
 Patrick John Flueger as Chuck Cranston
 Ray McKinnon as Uncle Wes Warnicker
 Kim Dickens as Aunt Lulu Warnicker
 Mary-Charles Jones as Cousin Sarah Warnicker
 Maggie Elizabeth Jones as Cousin Amy Warnicker
 Josh Warren as Richard "Rich" Sawyer
 Jayson Warner Smith (uncredited) as Officer Herb

Production

Development
In October 2008, Kenny Ortega was announced as director but left the project a year later after differences with Paramount and the production budget. Peter Sollett was also hired to write the script. Dylan Sellers, Neil Meron and Craig Zadan served as producer; Zadan having produced the original Footloose. In 2010, Craig Brewer came on to re-write the script after Crawford and Ortega left the project and also served as director. The writer of the original film, Dean Pitchford, also co-wrote the screenplay. Amy Vincent served as cinematographer.

Casting
In July 2007, Zac Efron was cast as Ren McCormack, but he left the project in March 2009. Two months later, it was reported that Chace Crawford would replace Efron, but he later had to back out due to scheduling conflicts. Thomas Dekker was a "top candidate" for the role but on June 22, 2010, Entertainment Weekly reported that Kenny Wormald had secured the lead role as McCormack.

Former Dancing with the Stars ballroom-dance professional Julianne Hough was cast as Ariel. Amanda Bynes, Miley Cyrus, and Hayden Panettiere were considered for the part before Hough was cast. Dennis Quaid was cast as Reverend Shaw Moore, and Miles Teller was cast as Willard Hewitt. On August 24, 2010, Andie MacDowell joined the cast as Quaid's wife. During an interview on The Howard Stern Show, Kevin Bacon said he declined a cameo appearance in the film as he did not like the role he was offered: Ren McCormack's deadbeat dad. Though Bacon passed on the role, he gave Brewer his blessing.

Filming
While the original film has the fictional town of "Bomont" located in Utah, the remake instead places the town in Georgia. On a budget of $24 million, principal photography began in September 2010 in and around metro Atlanta, and wrapped two months later in November. A courtroom scene was shot at the Newton County Historic Courthouse in Covington, Georgia on September 17, 20 and 21. A family scene was filmed at the New Senoia Raceway in Senoia on October 1.

A scene taken from the original film, in which McCormack plays a game of "chicken" with his love interest's boyfriend, was filmed on the Chattahoochee River bridge on Franklin Parkway in downtown Franklin also in October. The home and church scene in the film were filmed in downtown Acworth. Production used the sanctuary of the Acworth Presbyterian Church and the house of the Mayor, Tommy Allegood.

Music

The original soundtrack was released by Atlantic Records and Warner Music Nashville on September 27, 2011. It includes eight new songs and four remakes of songs from the original film's soundtrack. Brewer said, "I can promise Footloose fans that I will be true to the spirit of the original film. But I still gotta put my own Southern grit into it and kick it into 2011." Kenny Loggins' "Footloose" was covered by Blake Shelton for the remake, which is an upbeat country version. The film opens with several teens dancing to Loggins' original version of the song. Like the original film, the 2011 version also features "Bang Your Head (Metal Health)" by the heavy metal band Quiet Riot and "Let's Hear It for the Boy" by Deniece Williams.

Release and promotion
The film was originally scheduled for release in North America on April 1, 2011, but was moved to October 14, 2011. Footloose was released in Australia and New Zealand on October 6, 2011.

Paramount and HSN partnered for a 24-hour promotion on October 12, 2011. They sold clothing inspired by the film, such as women's red boots, denim, footwear and nail polish brands created by Vince Camuto and Steve Madden. To promote the film, Paramount sent the cast and director on a promotional tour in over a dozen cities.

Footloose was promoted on the October 11, 2011, episode of Dancing with the Stars. The episode featured film stars Kenny Wormald and Julianne Hough—a former champion on the show—dancing to the songs "Holding Out for a Hero" and "Footloose" from the film's soundtrack with Blake Shelton performing the song live. At the CMA Awards, Shelton was joined by original "Footloose" performer Kenny Loggins to sing the song. Many of Viacom owned channels, like MTV, Nickelodeon and CMT advertised and promoted the film.

Reception

Box office
Pre-release audience pollings predicted the film to take in $20 million its opening weekend. However, Paramount expected it to be closer to $15 million. Footloose opened in 3,549 theaters taking in $15.5 million and placing number two, behind Real Steel ($16.2 million) in its opening weekend. Exit polls indicated that the film appealed to 75 percent of females and 28 percent of the teen market. About 60 percent of the audience were over age 25 and 46 percent over age 35. The 20th highest grossing locations on Friday were in Salt Lake City, Oklahoma City, Knoxville, Kansas City, and San Antonio. The opening was lower than other recent dance films like, Save the Last Dance (2001, $23.4 million), Step Up (2006, $20.7 million), but it performed around the same as Step Up 3D (2010, $15.8 million) and You Got Served (2004, $16.1 million). The 1984 Footloose opened to $20 million when adjusted for ticket price inflation. In its second weekend the film held well, with a drop of 34 percent. It placed third and grossed an estimated $10.4 million.

In Australia, the film opened to $1.05 million and to $88,078 in New Zealand. Footloose has grossed $51.1 million in the United States and Canada, and $10.9 million in other countries, for a worldwide total of $62 million. The 1984 Footloose grossed over $80 million worldwide.

Critical response
Review aggregator Rotten Tomatoes reports that 68% of 174 surveyed critics have given the film a positive review; the average rating is 6.0/10. The website's consensus is: "While it hews closely to the 1984 original, Craig Brewer infuses his Footloose remake with toe-tapping energy and manages to keep the story fresh for a new generation." Metacritic, which assigns a weighted average score out of 100 to reviews from mainstream critics, gives the film a score of 58 based on 35 reviews. CinemaScore polls reported that the average grade moviegoers gave the film was an "A" on an A+ to F scale.

Lisa Schwarzbaum of Entertainment Weekly gave the film an A−. Praising the performance of Wormald, she said he "handily owns the role for a new audience" and closed her review saying, "Guardians of the '80s flame will approve of the production's sincere respect for the original; church still matters, and so do Ariel's red cowboy boots." Roger Ebert of the Chicago Sun-Times rated the film one and half stars out of four, calling it "a film without wit, humor or purpose".  Ebert further criticized the film for being too close to the 1984 original and Wormald's lack of charisma compared to Bacon.

Varietys Rob Nelson wrote that the film failed to distinguished itself from the original and criticized Wormald and Hough's acting performances, saying, "When the music stops, young Hough is saddled, like her co-star, with the impossible task of making 27-year-old verbiage sound fresh." Nelson wrote that Brewer's musical staging is "subtly less theatrical than Ross', but it hardly constitutes a reinvention" and that Brewer's film comes across as "slightly milder" than Ross', such as with Ariel's abuse by former boyfriend being toned down for 2011. Todd McCarthy of The Hollywood Reporter disliked how the dance numbers and action sequences were staged, shot and cut, saying, "The visual clumsiness does not disguise that Wormald (a professional dancer since extreme youth), especially, but the others too, are very good dancers. But the compositions vary randomly between close-ups, awkward medium shots and general coverage that cuts together with no cumulative dynamic power." Orlando Sentinel's Roger Moore gave the film two and half out of four stars.

Kenneth Turan of the Los Angeles Times wrote that the film "doesn't have the emotional impact of the original, but it ups the energy level." He said that the film was "not so much a remake as a renovation" and said the remake is similar to the original "in all the ways that count". The New York Timess A. O. Scott called the dance numbers "woefully inadequate" when compared with Glee, High School Musical and Step Up. For Wormald's performance he said, "He has energy but no real magnetism, and while he may be in possession of what are technically known as 'moves', his dancing lacks sensuality and a sense of release." Scott gave Miles Teller a good review saying that he "has a natural charisma that is both comic and kind of sexy". He described the music in the remake as "better and more eclectic than the original, with some blues, country and vintage metal mixed in with the peppy dance tunes".

Home media
Paramount Home Entertainment released Footloose on DVD and Blu-ray on March 6, 2012.

References

External links

 
 
 
 
 Footloose at The Numbers

2011 films
2011 romantic drama films
2010s coming-of-age drama films
2010s dance films
2010s musical drama films
2010s romantic musical films
2010s teen drama films
2010s teen romance films
American coming-of-age drama films
American dance films
Remakes of American films
American musical drama films
American romantic drama films
American romantic musical films
American teen drama films
American teen musical films
American teen romance films
2010s English-language films
Coming-of-age romance films
Films about proms
Films directed by Craig Brewer
Films scored by Deborah Lurie
Films set in Georgia (U.S. state)
Films shot in Georgia (U.S. state)
Films with screenplays by Craig Brewer
Musical film remakes
MTV Films films
Paramount Pictures films
Spyglass Entertainment films
2010s American films